Philip Douglas Jackson (born September 17, 1945) is an American former professional basketball player, coach, and executive. A power forward, Jackson played 12 seasons in the NBA, winning NBA championships with the New York Knicks in 1970 and 1973. Jackson was the head coach of the Chicago Bulls from 1989 to 1998, leading them to six NBA championships. He then coached the Los Angeles Lakers from 1999 to 2004 and again from 2005 to 2011; the team won five league titles under his leadership. Jackson's 11 NBA titles as a coach surpassed the previous record of nine set by Red Auerbach.

Jackson is known for his use of Tex Winter's triangle offense as well as a holistic approach to coaching that was influenced by Eastern philosophy, garnering him the nickname "Zen Master". Jackson cited Robert Pirsig's book Zen and the Art of Motorcycle Maintenance as one of the major guiding forces in his life. He also applied Native American spiritual practices as documented in his book Sacred Hoops. He is the author of several candid books about his teams and his basketball strategies. In 2007, Jackson was inducted into the Basketball Hall of Fame. In 1996, as part of celebrations for the NBA's 50th anniversary, Jackson was named one of the 10 greatest coaches in league history.

Jackson retired from coaching in 2011 and joined the Knicks as an executive in March 2014. He was dismissed as the Knicks' team president on June 28, 2017.

Early life
Jackson was born in Deer Lodge, Montana on September 17, 1945. Both of his parents, Charles and Elisabeth Funk Jackson, were Assemblies of God ministers. Elisabeth came from a long line of German Mennonites before her conversion to the Assemblies of God. In the churches that they served, his father generally preached on Sunday mornings and his mother on Sunday evenings. Eventually, his father became a ministerial supervisor. Phil, his two brothers, and his half-sister grew up in a remote area of Montana in an austere environment, in which no dancing or television was allowed. Jackson did not see his first movie until he was a senior in high school, and went to a dance for the first time in college. Growing up, he assumed he would become a minister.

Jackson attended high school in Williston, North Dakota, where he played varsity basketball and led the team to a state title. He also played football, was a pitcher on the baseball team, and threw the discus in track and field competitions. The high school now has a sports complex named after him. His brother Chuck speculated years later that the three Jackson sons threw themselves passionately into athletics because it was the only time they were allowed to do what other children were doing. Jackson attracted the attention of several baseball scouts. Their notes found their way to future NBA coach Bill Fitch, who had previously coached baseball, and had been doing some scouting for the Atlanta Braves. Fitch took over as head basketball coach at the University of North Dakota in the spring of 1962, during Jackson's junior year of high school.

College career
Bill Fitch successfully recruited Jackson to the University of North Dakota, where he was a member of the Sigma Alpha Epsilon fraternity. Jackson did well there, helping the Fighting Sioux to third- and fourth-place finishes in the NCAA Division II tournament in his sophomore and junior years (1965 and 1966). Both years, they were beaten by the Southern Illinois Salukis. Jackson's future Knicks teammate Walt Frazier was the Salukis' biggest star, but the two only faced off in 1965, as Frazier was academically ineligible in 1966.

Professional career

New York Knicks (1967–1978)

In 1967, Jackson was drafted in the second round by the New York Knicks. While he was a good all-around athlete, with unusually long arms, he was limited offensively but compensated with intelligence and hard work on defense. Jackson eventually established himself as a fan favorite and one of the NBA's leading substitutes, although he had very little playing time. He was a top reserve on the Knicks team that won the NBA title in 1973. Jackson did not play during New York's 1969–70 championship season due to spinal fusion surgery; however, he authored a book entitled Take It All, a photo diary of the Knicks' 1970 championship run.

Soon after the 1973 title, several key starters retired, creating an opening for Jackson in the starting lineup. In the 1974–75 NBA season, Jackson and the Milwaukee Bucks' Bob Dandridge shared the lead for total personal fouls, with 330 each. Jackson lived in Leonia, New Jersey, during this time.

New Jersey Nets (1978–1980)
After crossing the Hudson in 1978 to play two seasons for the New Jersey Nets, he retired as a player after the 1979–80 NBA season.

Coaching career

CBA and Puerto Rico (1982–1987)
In the years immediately following the end of his playing career, Jackson coached in professional leagues like the Continental Basketball Association (CBA) and Puerto Rico's National Superior Basketball (BSN). While in the CBA, he won his first coaching championship, leading the Albany Patroons to their first title in 1984. Jackson was named the CBA Coach of the Year in 1985. In Puerto Rico, he coached the Piratas de Quebradillas (1984 and 1987) and the Gallitos de Isabela (1984–1986). He regularly sought NBA jobs, but was turned down. Jackson had acquired a reputation for being sympathetic to the counterculture during his playing years, which may have scared off potential NBA employers.

Chicago Bulls (1987–1998)
In 1987, Jackson was hired as an assistant coach by the Chicago Bulls under Doug Collins. He was promoted to head coach in 1989. It was around this time that he met Tex Winter and became a devotee of Winter's triangle offense. Over nine seasons, Jackson coached the Bulls to six championships, winning three straight championships over separate three-year periods. The "three-peat" was the first since the Boston Celtics won eight titles in a row from 1959 through 1966.

 
Jackson and the Bulls made the playoffs every year, and failed to win the title only three times. Michael Jordan's first retirement after the 1992–1993 season marked the end of the first "three-peat", and although Jordan returned just before the 1995 playoffs, it was not enough to prevent a playoff elimination by the Orlando Magic.

Despite the Bulls' success, tension between Jackson and Bulls general manager Jerry Krause grew. Some believed that Krause felt under-recognized for building a championship team and believed that Jackson was indebted to him for giving him his first NBA coaching job. In the summer of 1997, Jackson was not invited to the wedding of Krause's stepdaughter, although all of the Bulls' assistant coaches were, as was Tim Floyd, then head coach at Iowa State, Jackson's eventual successor. After contentious negotiations, Jackson was signed for the 1997–98 season only. Krause announced the signing by emphasizing that Jackson would not be rehired even if the Bulls won the 1997–98 title. Jackson then told Krause that he seemed to be rooting for the other side, to which Krause responded, "I don't care if it's 82-and-0 this year, you're fucking gone." Krause publicly portrayed Jackson as a two-faced character who had very little regard for his assistant coaches.

After the Bulls' final title of the Jordan era in 1998, Jackson left the team vowing never to coach again. However, after taking a year off, he decided to give it another chance with the Los Angeles Lakers in 1999.

Los Angeles Lakers (1999–2004, 2005–2011)
Jackson took over a talented Lakers team and immediately produced results as he had done in Chicago. In his first year in Los Angeles, the Lakers went 67–15 during the regular season to top the league. Reaching the conference finals, they eliminated the Portland Trail Blazers in a tough seven-game series and then won the 2000 NBA championship by beating the Indiana Pacers.

With the talented superstar duo of Shaquille O'Neal and Kobe Bryant, the strong supporting cast of Glen Rice, Derek Fisher, Rick Fox, Devean George, A. C. Green, Robert Horry, and Brian Shaw, and the assistance of former Bulls Horace Grant, Ron Harper, and John Salley, Jackson led the Lakers to two additional titles in 2001 and 2002, against the Philadelphia 76ers and New Jersey Nets, adding up to his third three-peat as head coach. The main serious challenge the Lakers faced was from their conference rival, the Sacramento Kings.

However, injuries, weak bench play, and public tension between Bryant and O'Neal slowed the team down, and they were beaten in the second round of the 2003 NBA Playoffs by the eventual champion San Antonio Spurs.
Afterward, Jackson clashed frequently with Bryant. While remarkably efficient in Jackson's "triangle offense", Bryant had a personal distaste for Jackson's brand of basketball and subsequently called it "boring". In games, Bryant would often disregard the set offense completely to experiment with his own one-on-one moves, infuriating the normally calm Jackson. Bryant managed to test Jackson's patience enough that the "Zen Master" even demanded that Bryant be traded, although Lakers management rejected the request.

Prior to the 2003–04 season, the Lakers signed NBA star veterans Karl Malone and Gary Payton, who had been franchise players for the Utah Jazz and the Seattle SuperSonics, respectively, leading to predictions by some that the team would finish with the best record in NBA history. But from the first day of training camp, the Lakers were beset by distractions. Bryant's trial for sexual assault, continued public sniping between O'Neal and Bryant, and repeated disputes between Jackson and Bryant all affected the team during the season. Despite these distractions, the Lakers beat the defending champion Spurs en route to advancing to the 2004 NBA Finals and were heavy favorites to regain the title. However, they were upset by the Detroit Pistons, who used their strong defense to dominate the Lakers, winning the title four games to one. This marked the first time in ten attempts as head coach that Jackson had lost in the NBA Finals.

On June 18, 2004, three days after the loss to the Pistons, the Lakers announced that Jackson would leave his position as Lakers coach. Jackson was seeking to double his salary from $6 million to $12 million on his expiring contract. He had a contract offer outstanding from the Lakers, but he had not acted on it. Winter said Jackson announced at the All-Star break that he would not want to return to the Lakers if Bryant returned. Many fans attributed Jackson's departure directly to the wishes of Bryant, as Lakers owner Dr. Jerry Buss reportedly sided with Bryant. Jackson, Bryant and Buss all denied that Bryant had made any explicit demand regarding Jackson. However, O'Neal, upon hearing General Manager Mitch Kupchak's announcement of the team's willingness to trade O'Neal and its intention to keep Bryant, indicated that he felt the franchise was indeed pandering to Bryant's wishes with the departure of Jackson. O'Neal's trade to the Miami Heat was the end of the "Trifecta" that had led the Lakers to three championship titles.

That fall, Jackson released The Last Season, a book which describes his point of view of the tensions that surrounded the 2003–04 Lakers team. The book was pointedly critical of Kobe Bryant.

Without Jackson and O'Neal, the Lakers were forced to become a faster-paced team on the court. Though they achieved some success in the first half of the season, injuries to several players including Kobe Bryant and Lamar Odom forced the team out of contention, going 34–48 in 2004–05 and missing the playoffs for the first time in 11 years. Rudy Tomjanovich, Jackson's successor as coach, resigned midway through the season after coaching just 41 games, citing health issues not relating to his past bout with bladder cancer, which immediately led to speculation that the Lakers might bring Jackson back.

On June 15, 2005, the Lakers rehired Jackson. Jackson led the Lakers to a seventh-seed playoff berth. Once again promoting the notion of selfless team play embodied by the triangle offense, the team achieved substantial results, especially in the last month of the season. Jackson also worked very seamlessly with Bryant, who had earlier shown his desire to bring back Jackson to the bench. Bryant's regular-season performance won him the league scoring title and made him a finalist in MVP voting. However, the Lakers faced a tough 2006 first-round matchup against the second-seeded Phoenix Suns, who were led by eventual MVP winner Steve Nash. The Lakers jumped out to a 3–1 lead following a dramatic last-second shot by Bryant in overtime to win game four, but the Suns recovered to win the last three and take the series. It was the first time that a Jackson-coached team had failed to reach the second round of the playoffs.

On January 7, 2007, Jackson won his 900th game, then placing him 9th on the all-time win list for NBA coaches. With this win, Jackson became the fastest to reach 900 career wins, doing so in only 1,264 games and beating Pat Riley's previous record of 900 in 1,278 games.

On December 12, 2007, after announcing he would return to his position as coach just a few days prior, Jackson inked a 2-year contract extension to continue his tenure with the Los Angeles Lakers through the end of the 2009–2010 season.

During the 2007–08 season, the Lakers were able to obtain Pau Gasol in a trade with the Memphis Grizzlies. With another star to pair with Bryant, Jackson coached the Lakers to an appearance in the 2008 NBA Finals against the Boston Celtics. Boston went on to win the series 4–2, in the process handing Jackson and the Lakers their worst playoff loss ever in Game 6, a 39-point defeat. It was only the second time in 11 appearances that Jackson had lost an NBA Finals.

On December 25, 2008, Jackson became the sixth coach to win 1,000 games, with the Lakers defeating the Celtics in their first matchup since the last year's finals. He was the fastest to win 1,000 games, surpassing Pat Riley, who had taken 11 more games than Jackson.

Jackson again coached the Lakers to the NBA Finals in 2009, defeating the Utah Jazz, Houston Rockets, and Denver Nuggets in the process. In the Finals, the Lakers defeated the Orlando Magic 4–1, clinching Jackson's 10th NBA championship as head coach and surpassing the record for most championships won by a head coach previously held by him and Red Auerbach.

On February 3, 2010, Jackson recorded his 534th win as Lakers head coach, surpassing Pat Riley to become the most successful coach in franchise history. The Lakers would go on to a fifth consecutive playoff berth in 2010. They defeated the Oklahoma City Thunder, Utah Jazz, and Phoenix Suns in the playoffs before defeating the Boston Celtics in the 2010 NBA Finals, earning Jackson his 11th NBA championship as head coach and his fifth with the Lakers.

On July 1, 2010, Jackson, after giving it tremendous thought and consulting with his doctors over health concerns, announced that he would return to coach the Lakers for the 2010–11 season. On August 2, 2010, Jackson signed a new contract with the Lakers to return for what he mentioned was "his last stand", meaning the 2010–11 season would be his last. In January 2011, he reiterated that it would be his final season, explaining that in the past there was the possibility that maybe he would reconsider. "This year, there's no maybe", said Jackson. He retired after the Lakers were swept out of the playoffs in the conference semifinals by that season's eventual NBA champions, the Dallas Mavericks, meaning that he would not get a fourth three-peat (after previously achieving that feat in 1993, 1998 and 2002). In his final news conference that season, he noted that he did not have much of a relationship with Jerry or Jim Buss, and said, "When I leave here, I don't anticipate Lakers management will call me up and ask my advice."

After the Lakers fired Jackson's successor, Mike Brown, early in the 2012–13 season, they first approached Jackson to replace Brown. Jackson requested two days to consider the opening. He believed the Lakers would wait for his response, but the Lakers thought it was understood they would continue their search. The next day, the team talked with Mike D'Antoni and hired him in a unanimous decision by the front office. They felt D'Antoni's fast-paced style of play made him a "great fit" for the team, more suitable than Jackson's structured triangle offense. Jerry Buss' preference has always been for the Lakers to have a wide-open offense. In the two games leading up to D'Antoni's signing, Lakers fans at Staples Center had chanted "We Want Phil!"

Executive career
In 2014, Jackson was in discussions for months with the New York Knicks regarding an executive position with the team. On March 18, he was introduced as the president of the Knicks after signing a five-year, $60 million contract.

On April 21, 2014, over one week after the conclusion of the season, Mike Woodson and his entire staff were fired by Jackson. The Knicks finished the season with a 37–45 record and finished 9th in the Eastern Conference standings.

On June 9, 2014, the Knicks hired Derek Fisher as the head coach. Fisher played under Phil Jackson as a Laker and won five championships together.

On June 25, 2014, the Knicks traded guard Raymond Felton along with former NBA Defensive Player of the Year Tyson Chandler to the Dallas Mavericks. In return, the Knicks received Shane Larkin, José Calderón, Samuel Dalembert, and Wayne Ellington along with two picks for the following day's draft. The trade was the first one that he executed as a front office executive. On June 26, as part of the 2014 NBA draft, the Knicks selected Cleanthony Early as the 34th overall pick and Thanasis Antetokounmpo as the 51st overall pick, using the draft picks received in the trade from the Mavericks. The Knicks also acquired Louis Labeyrie, an additional second-round draft pick, after he was traded by the Pacers.

On January 7, 2015, the Knicks set a franchise record with 13 straight losses. The Knicks fell 101–91 to the Washington Wizards, giving New York its longest losing streak in the franchise's 69-year history. This record was extended to 16 straight losses after the NBA Global Games loss against the Milwaukee Bucks in London. They ended the season with a franchise-worst record of 17–65.

On June 25, 2015, the Knicks drafted Latvian Kristaps Porziņģis with the fourth overall pick in the 2015 NBA draft; he signed his rookie-scale contract with the Knicks on July 30, 2015. On that same night, the Knicks traded Tim Hardaway Jr. for the 19th pick in the draft, which would become Jerian Grant. Porziņģis was an NBA All-Rookie First Team selection for the 2016 season.

On June 28, 2017, the Knicks officially announced a mutual decision to part ways with Jackson. The speculated reasoning for the parting of ways was Jackson's attempted buying-out of Carmelo Anthony and his very public strife with Porziņģis. Jackson was replaced by his former subordinate Steve Mills.

Awards
Jackson won the 1996 NBA Coach of the Year Award. In the same year, he was named one of the ten greatest NBA coaches of all time by vote in an unranked compilation. At the time he was in his 8th year coaching; in the seven years prior he coached 574 games and won 414, with only 160 losses, and had a win–loss percentage of 72.1% – the highest of any coach on the list at that time. He continued his success in his later career; cumulative careers in perspective, he retains the highest win–loss percentage of any coach on this list at 70.4% (1155 wins, 485 losses).

In 2002 and 2010 the United States Sports Academy awarded Jackson the Amos Alonzo Stagg Coaching Award.

Jackson is a recipient of the state of North Dakota's Roughrider Award.

Head coaching record
Jackson has had a winning record every year as a head coach, and currently has the highest winning percentage of any Hall of Fame coach, and the highest of any NBA coach coaching 500 games or more. Along with his NBA-record 11 championships, he is the only coach to win at least 10 championships in any of North America's major professional sports.

At the end of the 2010 season he had the fifth-most wins of any NBA coach, and was one of only six to have over 1,000 wins. Of those six he was the only one who had not coached over 1,900 games, and the only one not included in the top 10 total games coached.

|-
| style="text-align:left;"|Chicago
| style="text-align:left;"|
|82||55||27||.671|| style="text-align:center;"|2nd in Central||16||10||6||.625
| style="text-align:center;"|Lost in Conf. Finals
|- ! style="background:#FDE910;"
| style="text-align:left;"|Chicago
| style="text-align:left;"|
|82||61||21||.744|| style="text-align:center;"|1st in Central||17||15||2||.882
| style="text-align:center;"|Won NBA Championship
|- ! style="background:#FDE910;"
| style="text-align:left;"|Chicago
| style="text-align:left;"|
|82||67||15||.817|| style="text-align:center;"|1st in Central||22||15||7||.682
| style="text-align:center;"|Won NBA Championship
|- ! style="background:#FDE910;"
| style="text-align:left;"|Chicago
| style="text-align:left;"|
|82||57||25||.695|| style="text-align:center;"|1st in Central||19||15||4||.789
| style="text-align:center;"|Won NBA Championship
|-
| style="text-align:left;"|Chicago
| style="text-align:left;"|
|82||55||27||.671|| style="text-align:center;"|2nd in Central||10||6||4||.600
| style="text-align:center;"|Lost in Conf. Semifinals
|-
| style="text-align:left;"|Chicago
| style="text-align:left;"|
|82||47||35||.573|| style="text-align:center;"|3rd in Central||10||5||5||.500
| style="text-align:center;"|Lost in Conf. Semifinals
|- ! style="background:#FDE910;"
| style="text-align:left;"|Chicago
| style="text-align:left;"|
|82||72||10||.878|| style="text-align:center;"|1st in Central||18||15||3||.833
| style="text-align:center;"|Won NBA Championship
|- ! style="background:#FDE910;"
| style="text-align:left;"|Chicago
| style="text-align:left;"|
|82||69||13||.841|| style="text-align:center;"|1st in Central||19||15||4||.789
| style="text-align:center;"|Won NBA Championship
|- ! style="background:#FDE910;"
| style="text-align:left;"|Chicago
| style="text-align:left;"|
|82||62||20||.756|| style="text-align:center;"|1st in Central||21||15||6||.714
| style="text-align:center;"|Won NBA Championship
|- ! style="background:#FDE910;"
| style="text-align:left;"|L.A. Lakers
| style="text-align:left;"|
|82||67||15||.817|| style="text-align:center;"|1st in Pacific||23||15||8||.652
| style="text-align:center;"|Won NBA Championship
|- ! style="background:#FDE910;"
| style="text-align:left;"|L.A. Lakers
| style="text-align:left;"|
|82||56||26||.683|| style="text-align:center;"|1st in Pacific||16||15||1||.938
| style="text-align:center;"|Won NBA Championship
|- ! style="background:#FDE910;"
| style="text-align:left;"|L.A. Lakers
| style="text-align:left;"|
|82||58||24||.707|| style="text-align:center;"|2nd in Pacific||19||15||4||.789
| style="text-align:center;"|Won NBA Championship
|-
| style="text-align:left;"|L.A. Lakers
| style="text-align:left;"|
|82||50||32||.610|| style="text-align:center;"|2nd in Pacific||12||6||6||.500
| style="text-align:center;"|Lost in Conf. Semifinals
|-
| style="text-align:left;"|L.A. Lakers
| style="text-align:left;"|
|82||56||26||.683|| style="text-align:center;"|1st in Pacific||22||13||9||.591
| style="text-align:center;"|Lost in NBA Finals
|-
| style="text-align:left;"|L.A. Lakers
| style="text-align:left;"|
|82||45||37||.549|| style="text-align:center;"|3rd in Pacific||7||3||4||.429
| style="text-align:center;"|Lost in First round
|-
| style="text-align:left;"|L.A. Lakers
| style="text-align:left;"|
|82||42||40||.512|| style="text-align:center;"|2nd in Pacific||5||1||4||.200
| style="text-align:center;"|Lost in First round
|-
| style="text-align:left;"|L.A. Lakers
| style="text-align:left;"|
|82||57||25||.695|| style="text-align:center;"|1st in Pacific||21||14||7||.667
| style="text-align:center;"|Lost in NBA Finals
|- ! style="background:#FDE910;"
| style="text-align:left;"|L.A. Lakers
| style="text-align:left;"|
|82||65||17||.793|| style="text-align:center;"|1st in Pacific||23||16||7||.696
| style="text-align:center;"|Won NBA Championship
|- ! style="background:#FDE910;"
| style="text-align:left;"|L.A. Lakers
| style="text-align:left;"|
|82||57||25||.695|| style="text-align:center;"|1st in Pacific||23||16||7||.696
| style="text-align:center;"|Won NBA Championship
|-
| style="text-align:left;"|L.A. Lakers
| style="text-align:left;"|
|82||57||25||.695|| style="text-align:center;"|1st in Pacific||10||4||6||.400
| style="text-align:center;"|Lost in Conf. Semifinals
|- class="sortbottom"
| style="text-align:left;"|Career
| ||1,640||1,155||485||.704|| ||333||229||104||.688||

Personal life
Jackson has five children and eight grandchildren. He married his first wife, Maxine, in 1967. They divorced in 1972. He married his second wife, June, in 1974, but they divorced in 2000. He dated Jeanie Buss, the daughter of Lakers owner Jerry Buss, whom he met in 1999. The two became engaged in 2013. On December 27, 2016, they announced the termination of their engagement in a joint statement on Twitter.

While he was the coach of the Chicago Bulls, he lived in Bannockburn, Illinois. He lived in Playa del Rey, Los Angeles when he was the coach of the Los Angeles Lakers. While he was the president of basketball operations of the New York Knicks, he lived in Midtown Manhattan, New York City. He currently resides in Flathead Lake, Montana.

He has 26 hours of graduate study in psychology.

Jackson has admitted to using marijuana and LSD in the past. In 2010, he said he did not believe that prisons should be filled with people prosecuted for marijuana, but called California's Proposition 19, which would have legalized marijuana, poorly written. Jackson is also a Deadhead, a fan of the Grateful Dead, and attended some of their concerts in the 1970s and 1990s.

In a 1990 interview with the Chicago Tribune, Jackson said that he did not care for preachers who browbeat the audience, describing his religious views as, "I’ve always liked the concept of God being beyond anything that the human mind can conceive. I think there is a pantheistic-deistic-American Indian combination religion out there for Americans. That rings true to me."

Jackson was diagnosed with prostate cancer in March 2011. He told the Lakers players in May 2011, when they were involved in a second-round playoff series against the Mavericks. Jackson decided to delay his surgery until after the playoffs.

In 2020, he was a subject of the documentary miniseries The Last Dance, alongside Michael Jordan, Scottie Pippen, Steve Kerr and Dennis Rodman.

Books

See also
List of NBA championship head coaches

References

Further reading

External links

 
  at NBA.com
  at NBA.com
 NBA career stats as a coach at Basketball-Reference
 NBA career stats as a player at Basketball-Reference
 

1945 births
Living people
Albany Patroons coaches
American memoirists
American men's basketball coaches
American men's basketball players
American people of German descent
Basketball coaches from Montana
Basketball coaches from North Dakota
Basketball players from Montana
Basketball players from North Dakota
BSN coaches
Centers (basketball)
Chicago Bulls assistant coaches
Chicago Bulls head coaches
Los Angeles Lakers head coaches
Naismith Memorial Basketball Hall of Fame inductees
National Basketball Association championship-winning head coaches
New Jersey Nets assistant coaches
New Jersey Nets announcers
New Jersey Nets players
New York Knicks draft picks
New York Knicks executives
New York Knicks players
North Dakota Fighting Hawks men's basketball players
People from Bannockburn, Illinois
People from Flathead County, Montana
People from Leonia, New Jersey
People from Powell County, Montana
People from Williston, North Dakota
Power forwards (basketball)
Writers from Montana
Writers from North Dakota
20th-century American non-fiction writers
21st-century American non-fiction writers